Big Brother VIPs 2 was the second celebrity spin-off season of the Belgian version of Big Brother aired in the Flemish Region of Belgium on Kanaal Twee.

The show took place over ten days from the end of August to the beginning of September 2006, the events were kept secret. Each of the ten days was shown in ten weekly episodes starting from 12 October 2006 to 28 December 2006. 12 VIP housemates entered the Big Brother house.

The highlight of the season was Petra, who voluntarily left the house less than an hour after she entered. This is the shortest stay by a housemate in Big Brother world history. 

The winner of this season was Pim Symoens.

This celebrity season had a lower rating compared to the regular season. Some videos of the show went viral and were more successful on the internet than the broadcast episodes. Critics complained about the fame of some of the contestants. There was also criticism about the inclusion of Javier De Rycke who was ejected from the last regular season because of aggressive behavior.

Format
In contrast with the regular season, the VIPs season was completely prerecorded.

Other differences with the regular season were that there were no weekly tasks but daily tasks. Every day there were two tasks. One task in the morning to decide the Big Boss of the day. The other task in the afternoon was to decide the household budget for the next day. If they succeeded in the task, housemates could order the same night for the next day. Failing the task, the housemates had an emergency ration the next day.

There were no public evictions. Each housemate would nominate two of their fellow housemates. The two (or more) housemates with the most nominations would be up for eviction. It was the Big Boss who decided who was evicted.

Big Boss had the same benefits of the regular season but had some more during the VIPs season:
 Same benefits: being able to use the luxury loft. The loft was always provided with enough food and drinks. Big Boss could choose one of the other housemates to stay in the loft. Big Boss was the responsible one for the shopping.
 Added benefits: Big Boss didn't have to participate in the household task. It was Big Boss only who evicted one of the nominated housemates.

The winner didn't receive a money prize, since all the celebrity housemates got paid 500 euro for every day in the house.

Housemates

Daily summary

Nominations table

External links
 World of Big Brother

References

VIP 02
2006 television seasons